Tio Bitar ("Ten pieces") is the fourth album by the Swedish psychedelic rock group Dungen.

It was released as a CD on 23 April 2007, by Subliminal Sounds (Sweden), with a vinyl version to follow on the same label. The album was released in the US on Kemado Records on 15 May 2007, followed by releases on Vroom-Sound in Japan and Dew Process in Australia in June 2007.

Track listing
"Intro" – 3:47
"Familj" ("Family") – 5:45
"Gör det nu" ("Do it Now") – 3:07
"C visar vägen" ("C Shows the Way") – 4:32
"Du ska inte tro att det ordnar sig" ("You Shouldn't Expect it to Work Out") – 3:30
"Mon Amour" – ("My Love") – 8:47
"Så blev det bestämt" ("So it was Settled") – 4:01
"Ett skäl att trivas" ("A Reason to Enjoy") – 3:03
"Svart är himlen" ("Black is the Sky") – 2:17
"En gång i år kom det en tår" ("Once This Year There Came a Tear") – 3:45

2007 albums
Dungen albums